Air Inter Flight 148 was a scheduled passenger flight from Lyon Satolas Airport to Strasbourg Airport in France. On 20 January 1992, the Airbus A320 operating the flight crashed into the slopes of the Vosges Mountains, France, near Mont Sainte-Odile, while on a non-precision approach at Strasbourg Airport. Eighty-seven of the 96 people on board were killed, while the remaining nine were all injured.

Aircraft
The aircraft, an Airbus A320-111, registration F-GGED, serial number 15, first flew on 4 November 1988, and was delivered to Air Inter on 22 December 1988. At the time of the accident, the aircraft had accumulated a total of 6,316 airframe hours.

Accident
Flight 148, commanded by 42-year-old Captain Christian Hecquet, with 8,800 flight hours, and 37-year-old First Officer Joël Cherubin, with 3,600 flight hours. departed Lyon-Satolas (now called Lyon-Saint-Exupéry Airport) at 17:20 UTC. Both pilots were relatively new to the A320 with a combined total of only 300 hours in the aircraft, but both were familiar with Strasbourg Airport as both had flown into the airport many times. 

As the flight neared Strasbourg Airport, they informed ATC of their desire to follow the ILS approach for Runway 23 until the airport was in sight, followed by a visual approach onto Runway 05. This type of approach onto Runway 05 was common at Strasbourg Airport; being in close proximity to mountains and high terrain, Runway 05 was not equipped with ILS since the high terrain would interfere with the glide slope signal transmitted by the ILS. ATC denied the pilots approach request, saying there would be a significant delay because of conflict with several aircraft departing on Runway 05 and instead offered vectors for the VOR/DME approach for Runway 05, which the pilots accepted. The flight was cleared to descend to 5,000ft and vectored to the ANDLO waypoint 11 nautical miles from the Strasbourg Airport VOR. ATC cleared the aircraft onto the final approach at 18:19 UTC as it passed ANDLO, where the pilots turned left onto the runway heading of 050 degrees and continued to descend as per the approach chart. 

At 18:20:33 UTC, Flight 148 crashed into the slopes of Mont Sainte-Odile at 2,620ft, 10.5 nautical miles from the airport. The search and rescue operation commenced at 18:40. 3 helicopters, 24 motorcycles and 950 people from the Police Nationale, National Gendarmerie, Sécurité Civile, as well as 24 amateur radio operators participated in the search and rescue operation. Although almost 1000 people were involved in the search effort, it was criticised for being unprepared and disorganised as it was not clear which of the 3 agencies would lead the search, hampering the search and rescue effort. The crash site was not discovered until 22:35 UTC (4 hours and 15 minutes later) when a group of journalists were led to the wreckage by a surviving passenger. The first rescuers, a group of Gendarmes, arrived at 22:49 after being led to the wreckage by the same survivor and a journalist.

The pilots had no warning of the imminent impact because Air Inter had not equipped its aircraft with a ground proximity warning system (GPWS).

Aftermath

Accident investigators recommended 35 changes in their report. Airbus modified the interface of the autopilot so that a vertical speed setting would be displayed as a four-digit number, preventing confusion with the Flight Path Angle mode. The flight data recorder was upgraded so that it was able to withstand higher temperatures and for longer. The report also recommended that pilot training for the A320 should be enhanced and that ground proximity warning systems should be installed on them. Air Inter equipped its aircraft with ground proximity warning systems before the investigation was completed.

Dramatization
The story of the disaster was featured on the ninth season of Cineflix television show Mayday in the episode entitled "The Final Blow" (also known as Air Crash Investigation as episode entitled "Crashed and Missing" or "Doomed to Fail" (S09E07)).

It is featured in season 2, episode 5, of the TV show Why Planes Crash, in an episode called "Sudden Impact".

See also 

Indian Airlines Flight 605, similar crash in India two years earlier
Crossair Flight 3597, a similar CFIT crash caused by violating Minimum Safe Altitude
Air China Flight 129, another CFIT accident caused by multiple pilot and ATC errors
American Airlines Flight 965, a Boeing 757 that crashed in a CFIT accident due to multiple pilot errors and poor computer design
Alitalia Flight 404, another CFIT accident that occurred when landing in Zurich. This accident involved pilot errors and a NAV-1 receiver failure that led to the failure of the glideslope and GPWS.
Garuda Indonesia Flight 152, a CFIT accident caused by pilot and ATC errors combined with GPWS failure

References

External links 

Bureau of Enquiry and Analysis for Civil Aviation Safety
"RAPPORT de la commission d'enquête sur l'accident survenu le 20 janvier 1992 près du Mont Sainte-Odile (Bas Rhin) à l'Airbus A 320 immatriculé F-GGED exploité par la compagnie Air Inter. [REPORT of the Commission of Inquiry on into the accident on 20 January 1992 near Mont Sainte-Odile (Bas-Rhin) of the AIRBUS A320 registered F-GGED operated by the company Air Inter]"  (Archive)
PDF version 
Text version of final report at the University of Bielefeld 

Airliner accidents and incidents caused by pilot error
Airliner accidents and incidents involving controlled flight into terrain
Aviation accidents and incidents in France
Accidents and incidents involving the Airbus A320
Aviation accidents and incidents in 1992
Airliner accidents and incidents caused by design or manufacturing errors
Air Inter accidents and incidents
January 1992 events in Europe
Aviation accidents and incidents caused by air traffic controller error